"Sex (I'm A...)" is a song by American new wave band Berlin from their second studio album, Pleasure Victim (1982). The song was co-written by group members John Crawford, Terri Nunn, and David Diamond and sung as a duet by Crawford and Nunn.

Released as the album's second single in February 1983, the single, influenced by Donna Summer's seminal "I Feel Love", became a cult hit on American radio and brought the group into the mainstream. Despite the significant attention, the song's racy lyrics resulted in its being banned from several radio stations. The single peaked at No. 62 on the Billboard Hot 100 for two weeks in late March and early April 1983. The song was also the first single release from the band's new label, Geffen Records.

According to disc jockey Richard Blade, the song's lyrics referenced his relationship with Nunn.  Her mother Joy made an appearance in the music video.

Track listing
 "Sex (I'm A...)" - 5:08
 "Tell Me Why" - 3:50

Charts

Weekly charts

Year-end charts

Cover versions
Canadian electroclash musician Peaches covered the song as a bonus track for her albums The Teaches of Peaches and Fatherfucker.
Australian producer/DJ Mike Felks released a cover of the song in 2009, featuring Annemarie.
Lovage released a cover in 2001 on their album Music to Make Love to Your Old Lady By

References

1982 songs
1983 singles
Berlin (band) songs
Geffen Records singles
Music videos directed by Russell Mulcahy